Mango, formerly  Sansanné-Mango , is a city in northern Togo. It is situated on the Oti River in the Savanes Region. The population is about 41,464 people (2007).

Climate

History

Economy
The town is a trading center for cattle and peanuts.

Transportation
The town lies on the main north–south road (Route Nationale No. 1) in Togo.

Demography
The town is mainly inhabited by Chakosi people.

Health
In 2014, the Association of Baptists for World Evangelism constructed a hospital (Hospital of Hope) in Mango and it opened the facility in Feb 2015.

References

External links
 Climate Data

Populated places in Savanes Region, Togo